Léon Walker (29 July 1937 – 29 October 2006) was a Swiss footballer and manager.

Playing career
Walker began his career at Young Boys in 1959, joining Sion in 1963. Walker found himself back at Young Boys the following year, joining Luzern in 1966 for a short spell. Walker rejoined Sion in 1966, retiring at the club in 1970.

On 4 October 1959, Walker made his debut for Switzerland in a 4–0 defeat against West Germany. The defeat was Walker's only appearance for his country.

Managerial career
Following his retirement, Walker moved into coaching, managing Switzerland's under-21's. In 1979, Walker was appointed manager of the senior Switzerland team. Walker managed Switzerland for sixteen games, winning four, drawing once and losing eleven games.

References

People from Brig-Glis
1937 births
2006 deaths
Association football defenders
Swiss men's footballers
Switzerland national football team managers
Swiss football managers
Swiss Super League players
BSC Young Boys players
FC Sion players
FC Luzern players
Sportspeople from Valais